The deputy secretary of the Interior, in the United States government, advises and assists the secretary of the interior in the supervision and direction of the Department of the Interior and its activities, and succeeds the secretary in his or her absence, sickness, or unavailability. The deputy secretary of the interior is appointed by the president and confirmed by the Senate. In 1990, the title of the position was changed from under secretary of the interior to deputy secretary of the interior.

After Elizabeth Klein's nomination was withdrawn by the Biden administration in March 2021, it was reported that Beaudreau was selected as the nominee. On April 15, 2021, his nomination was sent to the Senate. On June 17, 2021, his nomination was confirmed in the United States Senate by an 88–9 vote.

Section 3346 of U.S. Code within Title 5, or 5 U.S.C. § 3346, details time limitations of acting officers. An acting officer may serve no longer than 210 days after the vacancy, from the date a first or second nomination is pending before the Senate, the date a first or second nomination is withdrawn, rejected, or returned, or the date the Senate reconvenes if the appointment has taken place while Congress has adjourned sine die.

List of deputy secretaries of interior

References

Interior